Azay Guliyev (born 1971) is the Chair of the OSCE Parliamentary Assembly General Committee on Economic Affairs, Science, Technology and Environment, Chair of the Silk Road Support Group within the OSCE PA, Coordinator of the Baku Parliamentary Platform for Dialogue and Cooperation, Head of Delegation of Azerbaijan to the OSCE PA and the Member of Parliament of the Republic of Azerbaijan.

Positions in the Parliament 
Member of Parliament since: 2005

Political Party Affiliation: Independent

Electoral District: Binagadi, Baku

2005–present: Member of the Permanent Committee on State Building and Legislative Policy of the Parliament of Azerbaijan

2005–present: Head of Azerbaijan-Romania Inter-parliamentary Working Group

2005–present: Member of the Azerbaijan-Austria, Azerbaijan-Czech Republic, Azerbaijan-Estonia, Azerbaijan-Republic of South Africa, Azerbaijan-Serbia, Azerbaijan-Switzerland, Azerbaijan-Turkey, and Azerbaijan-Uzbekistan Inter-parliamentary Working Groups.

2019–present: Member of the Azerbaijan-Germany, Azerbaijan-Italy, Azerbaijan-Spain, and Azerbaijan-the United Kingdom Inter-parliamentary Working Groups.

Current positions and activity in the OSCE PA 
Starting in 2005, and remaining so to the present day, he became a member of the Delegation of Azerbaijan to the OSCE Parliamentary Assembly. He also participated in the election monitoring missions of OSCE PA in the United Kingdom, Russian Federation, Ukraine, Serbia, Georgia, Romania, and Belarus from 2005 to 2013, and, also in 2013, became the  vice-chair of the General Committee on Political Affairs and Security of the OSCE PA.

In 2016 he was appointed as the Head of the OSCE Parliamentary Assembly Election Observation Mission to Montenegro, and the Head of the OSCE Parliamentary Assembly Election Observation Mission to the North Macedonia, both for their parliamentary elections. Also in 2016, he became the vice-president of the OSCE PA, being later re-elected until July 2022.

In 2017, he was appointed as Special Coordinator and Leader of the short-term OSCE observer mission to Kyrgyzstan for their presidential election, and became the initiator of establishment and was elected as the Chair of the Silk Road Support Group within the OSCE PA, which currently consists of 27 OSCE States.

In 2020, he became the Head of the Delegation of Azerbaijan to the OSCE PA, remaining so to this day. In 2020, he was appointed as the Special Coordinator and Leader of the short-term OSCE observer mission to Albania for the parliamentary elections. In 2021–2022, he served as the OSCE PA Special Representative on South East Europe.

In 2022 he was elected as the Chair of the General Committee on Economic Affairs, Science, Technology and Environment.

Other positions 
Current positions:

2008–2021: Chair of the Council on State Support to NGOs under the auspices of the President of the Republic of Azerbaijan

References

External links 

meclis.az

1971 births
Living people